This is a list of women music publishers who were active prior to the year 1900. Most of these names were extracted from searching WorldCat using prefixes such as "Veuve" or "Witwe" and their variants (both meaning widow in French and German respectively). The years active were determined from the holdings in Worldcat or as indicated in the footnotes. Since Worldcat should not be taken to represent all published works, most of the dates should be considered approximations primarily based on the evidence available.

Works consulted

Notes

Women in music
Music publishers (people)